Vardoulakis is a Greek surname. Notable people with the surname include:

 Dimitris Vardoulakis (born 1975), Greek philosopher
 Ioannis Vardoulakis (1949–2009), Greek scientist

Greek-language surnames